Dhanin Chearavanont (born 19 April 1939), known in Chinese as Chia Kok Min, is a Thai billionaire businessman, based in Bangkok. He is the senior chairman of Charoen Pokphand, Thailand's largest private company. Dhanin is head of the Chearavanont family, which was ranked by Forbes Asia in 2017 as Asia's fourth-wealthiest family with a net worth of US$36.6 billion. As of January 2021, his net worth was estimated at $17.2 billion. By July 2021 Forbes stated Dhanin Chearavanont and his brothers worth to be US$12.8 Billion; and in July 2022, Forbes ranked the Chearavanont Brothers as the richest in Thailand.

Early life and education
Dhanin was born in 1939, the fourth and youngest son of Chia Ek Chor. He is a follower of Buddhism.

Dhanin attended primary school at Sarasit Pittayalai School in Ban Pong District, Ratchaburi, until graduating in 1949 and went to graduate from high school in 1951 from Shantou No.1 High School, China and higher education in 1956 from the Education University of Hong Kong including training from the National Defence College of Thailand.

Business
Chearavanont built a close relationship with leadership of Communist Party of China, which allowed his business CP to be the largest foreign lessee of land in China, amounting to 200,00 hectares of land in 2012.

Philanthropy

In 2020, Dhanin donated US$21.8 million to fight the spread of Covid-19 in Thailand.

References

External links
 Forbes Dhanin Chearavanont

1939 births
Living people
Dhanin Chearavanont
Dhanin Chearavanont
Dhanin Chearavanont
People from Chenghai
Dhanin Chearavanont
Dhanin Chearavanont
Dhanin Chearavanont